Kentucky Route 18 (KY 18), also known as Burlington Pike, is a state highway that serves as a major road through Florence and Burlington in the U.S. state of Kentucky. The western terminus of the route is at KY 338 in Rabbit Hash. The eastern terminus is at KY 1017 in Florence.

Route description
It begins at KY 338 (East Bend Road) in the small hamlet of Rabbit Hash and travels north along the Ohio River to the small town of Belleview.  In Belleview, KY 20 splits off KY 18 and heads north, as KY 18 turns east toward Burlington.  KY 18 passes through Burlington as a residential road, until its intersection with KY 338, where it becomes less residential and more commercial.  A couple miles east, KY 18 intersects with KY 237 (Camp Ernst Road heading south and North Bend Road heading north).  The large church First Church of Christ sits on the corner of KY 18 and Camp Ernst Road (KY 237).  KY 18 continues east, still as a mostly commercial road.  At its busiest point, KY 18 intersects with KY 842 (Houston Road to the north and Hopeful Church Road to the south).  Continuing east, KY 18 spurs off Mall Road, a commercial road holding much of the commerce in the city of Florence, including the Florence Mall.  Mall Road also connects KY 18 with U.S. 42/U.S. 127, although the southbound onramp to I-71/75 does not provide any direct access to U.S. 42; the onramp parallels the interstate until it is south of U.S. 42.
East of I-71/I-75, KY 18 turns slightly north in its final couple miles.  Boone County High School is located along KY 18 less than a mile before its eastern terminus, at KY 1017 (Turfway Road).

Major intersections

References

0018
Transportation in Boone County, Kentucky